Julienne Salvat (12 May 1932 – 11 March 2019) was a French teacher, poet, Femme de lettres, and actress from Martinique who spent a large part of her career in Réunion. She was the recipient of the Silver Medal from the Société Académique ASL in 2010.

Biography
Julienne Salvat was born in Fort-de-France, Martinique on 12 May 1932.

She was a French teacher first in Martinique and in Bordeaux, before her relocation to Réunion, working in Saint-Denis, Réunion from 1965 until 1992. In addition to her teaching career, she devoted herself to theater and poetry. Salvat militated for Reunionese culture within the associations Union for the Defense of Reunion Identity (UDIR) and Association Reunion Communication and Culture (ARCC). She animated poetic and literary events, and regularly participated in various national and international fairs and festivals of poetry and theater. Salvat was an Indian Ocean delegate member of the Société des poètes français; as well as a member of Centre Réunionnais d'Action Culturelle (CRAC), L’ADELF (Association des Ecrivains de Langue Française), and Maison des Ecrivains et de la Littérature. 

Salvat died in France on 11 March 2019, and was buried in Bègles.

Awards
2010, Silver Medal, Société Académique ASL

Selected works
Tessons enflammés (poetry, [1993).
Poèmes d’Elles (collection of women's poetry from the Indian Ocean region, edited and prefaced by Julienne Salvat, 1997).
Chants de veille (poetry, 1998).
Fractiles (poetry, 2001).
La lettre d'Avignon (novel, 2002).
Feuillesonge (poetry, 2006).
Camille, récits d'hier et d'aujourd'hui (novel, 2007).

References

1932 births
2019 deaths
People from Fort-de-France
20th-century French poets
20th-century French educators
20th-century French women writers
21st-century French poets
21st-century French educators
21st-century French women writers
Martiniquais writers